The Kuchurhan is a river in Eastern Europe. It is a tributary of the Turunchuk (a branch of the Dniester) which begins on the Podolian Upland in Ukraine. It then flows SSE and forms part of the border between Transnistria in Moldova and the Odesa Oblast in Ukraine.

A dam has been built on the river just north of the Dniester, forming the Kuchurhan Reservoir.  The village of Kuchurhan in Ukraine is located near the river just north of the reservoir and is the site of an important border crossing into Transnistria.

References

External links
 Our Waters: Joining Hands Across Borders - First Assessment of Transboundary Rivers, Lakes and Groundwaters, UNECE (2007)
 Transboundary Diagnostic Study for the Dniester River Basin, OSCE/UNECE Project: Transboundary Co-operation and Sustainable Management of the Dniester River (November 2005)

Rivers of Odesa Oblast
Rivers of Moldova
International rivers of Europe
Moldova–Ukraine border